Malanima is an Italian surname. Notable people with the surname include: 

Nada Malanima (born 1953), Italian singer, better known as Nada (singer)
Paolo Malanima (born 1950), Italian economic historian

Surnames of Italian origin